Below is a list of books and sources about the potlatch, an Indigenous ceremony from the north west coast of Canada, and the United States.

General 
 Barnett, Homer G. (1938) "The Nature of the Potlatch."  American Anthropologist. vol. 40, no. 3, pp. 349–358.
 Bracken, Christopher (1997) The Potlatch Papers: A Colonial Case History.  Chicago: University of Chicago Press.
 Cole, Douglas, and Ira Chaikin (1990) An Iron Hand upon the People: The Law against the Potlatch on the Northwest Coast.  Vancouver: Douglas & McIntyre. 
Mauss, Marcel (2002) "The Gift." London: Routledge.
 Rosman, Abraham, and Paula G. Rubel (1971) Feasting with Mine Enemy: Rank and Exchange among Northwest Coast Societies.  Prospect Heights, Illinois: Waveland Press.
 Rubel, Paula G., and Abraham Rosman (1983) "The Evolution of Exchange Structures and Ranking: Some Northwest Coast and Athapaskan Examples."  Journal of Anthropological Research, vol. 39, no. 1, pp. 1–25.

Tlingit 
 de Laguna, Frederica (1972) Under Mount Saint Elias: The History and Culture of the Yakutat Tlingit.  Washington: Smithsonian Institution Press.
 Emmons, George Thornton (1991) The Tlingit Indians.  Ed. by Frederica de Laguna.  Seattle: University of Washington Press.
 Kan, Sergei (1989) Symbolic Immortality: The Tlingit Potlatch of the Nineteenth Century.  Washington: Smithsonian Books.  .
 Dauenhauer, Nora Marks, and Richard Dauenhauer (eds.) (1990) Haa Tuwanáagu Yís, for Healing Our Spirit: Tlingit Oratory.  (Classics of Tlingit Oral Literature, vol. 2.)  Seattle: University of Washington Press.

Haida
 Boelscher, Marianne (1988) The Curtain Within: Haida Social and Mythical Discourse.  Vancouver: University of British Columbia Press.
 Stearns, Mary Lee (1981) Haida Culture in Custody: The Masset Band.  Seattle: University of Washington Press.
 Steltzer, Ulli (1984) A Haida Potlatch.  Seattle: University of Washington Press.

Tsimshianic-speakers
 Adams, John W. (1973) The Gitksan Potlatch: Population Flux, Resource Ownership and Reciprocity.  Toronto: Holt, Rinehart, and Winston of Canada.
 Beynon, William (2000) Potlatch at Gitsegukla: William Beynon’s 1945 Field Notebooks.  Ed. by Margaret Anderson and Marjorie Halpin.  Vancouver: UBC Press.
 Boas, Franz (1916) Tsimshian Mythology.  Washington: Government Printing Office.
 Daly, Richard (2005) Our Box Was Full: An Ethnography for the Delgamuukw Plaintiffs.  Vancouver: UBC Press.
 "Fur Trader, A" (Peter Skene Ogden) (1933) Traits of American Indian Life and Character.  San Francisco: Grabhorn Press.  Reprinted, Dover Publications, 1995.  (Ch. 4 is the earliest known description of a Nisga'a potlatch.)
 Garfield, Viola E. (1939) "Tsimshian Clan and Society."  University of Washington Publications in Anthropology, vol. 7, no. 3, pp. 167–340.
 Glavin, Terry (1990) A Death Feast in Dimlahamid.  Vancouver: New Star Books.
 Grumet, Robert Stephen (1975) "Changes in Coast Tsimshian Redistributive Activities in the Fort Simpson Region of British Columbia, 1788-1862."  Ethnohistory, vol. 22, no. 4, pp. 294–318.
 Hoyt-Goldsmith, Diane (1997) Potlatch: A Tsimshian Celebration.  New York: Holiday House.
 McDonald, James A. (1990) "Poles, Potlatching, and Public Affairs: The Use of Aboriginal Culture in Development."  Culture, vol. 10, no. 2, pp. 103–120.
 McDonald, James A. (1995) "Building a Moral Community: Tsimshian Potlatching, Implicit Knowledge and Everyday Experiences."  Cultural Studies, vol. 9, no. 1, pp. 125–144.
 McDonald, James A. (2003) People of the Robin: The Tsimshian of Kitsumkalum.  CCI Press and Alberta ACADRE Network.
 McNeary, Stephen A. (1976) Where Fire Came Down: Social and Economic Life of the Niska.  Ph.D. diss., Bryn Mawr College, Bryn Mawr, Penn.
 Pierce, William Henry (1933) From Potlatch to Pulpit.  Vancouver: Vancouver Bindery.
 Roth, Christopher F. (2002) "Goods, Names, and Selves: Rethinking the Tsimshian Potlatch."  American Ethnologist, vol. 29, no. 1, pp. 123–150.
 Seguin, Margaret (ed.) (1984) The Tsimshian: Images of the Past: Views for the Present. Vancouver: University of British Columbia Press.
 Seguin, Margaret (1985) Interpretive Contexts for Traditional and Current Coast Tsimshian Feasts.  Ottawa: National Museums of Canada.
 Seguin, Margaret (1986) "Understanding Tsimshian 'Potlatch.'"  In: Native Peoples: The Canadian Experience, ed. by R. Bruce Morrison and C. Roderick Wilson, pp. 473–500.  Toronto: McClelland and Stewart.
 Vaughan, J. Daniel (1984) "Tsimshian Potlatch and Society: Examining a Structural Analysis."  In: The Tsimshian and Their Neighbors of the North Pacific Coast, ed. by Jay Miller and Carol M. Eastman, pp. 58–68.  Seattle: University of Washington Press.

Kwakwaka'wakw
 Benedict, Ruth (1934) Patterns of Culture.  Boston: Houghton Mifflin.
 Boas, Franz (1897) "The Social Organization and the Secret Societies of the Kwakiutl Indians."  pp. 311–738 In: Report of the U.S. National Museum for 1895, pp. 311–738.  Washington.
 Boas, Franz (1966) Kwakiutl Ethnography.  Ed. by Helen Codere.  Chicago: University of Chicago Press.
 Codere, Helen (1950) Fighting with Property: A Study of Kwakiutl Potlatching and Warfare, 1792-1930.  New York: J. J. Augustin.
 Codere, Helen (1956) "The Amiable Side of Kwakiutl Life: The Potlatch and the Play Potlatch."  American Anthropologist, vol. 28, pp. 334–351.
 Drucker, Philip, and Robert F. Heizer (1967) To Make My Name Good: A Reexamination of the Southern Kwakiutl Potlatch.  Berkeley: University of California Press.
 Goldman, Irving (1975) The Mouth of Heaven: An Introduction to Kwakiutl Religious Thought. Huntington, N.Y.: Robert E. Krieger Publishing Company.
 Graeber, David (2001) Toward an Anthropological Theory of Value: The False Coin of Our Own Dreams.  New York: Palgrave.
 Harkin, Michael E. (1990) "Mortuary Practices and the Category of the Person among the Heiltsuk."  Arctic Anthropology, vol. 27, no. 1, pp. 87–108.
 Masco, Joseph (1995) "'It Is a Strict Law That Bids Us Dance': Cosmologies, Colonialism, Death and Ritual Authority in the Kwakwaka'wakw Potlatch, 1849-1922."  Comparative Studies in Society and History, vol. 37, no. 1, pp. 41–75.
 Olson, Ronald L. (1950) "Black Market in Prerogatives among the Northern Kwakiutl."  Kroeber Anthropological Society Papers, vol. 1, pp. 78–80.
 Spradley, James P. (1969) Guests Never Leave Hungry: The Autobiography of James Sewid, a Kwakiutl Indian.  New Haven, Conn.: Yale University Press.
 Walens, Stanley (1981) Feasting with Cannibals: An Essay on Kwakiutl Cosmology.  Princeton, N.J.: Princeton University Press.
 Wolf, Eric R. (1999) Envisioning Power: Ideologies of Dominance and Crisis.  Berkeley: University of California Press.

Nuu-chah-nulth
 Clutesi, George (1969) Potlatch.  Sidney, B.C.: Gray's Publishing.
 Drucker, Philip (1951) The Northern and Central Nootkan Tribes.  Washington: United States Government Printing Office.
 Jewitt, John R. (1815) A Narrative of the Adventures and Sufferings of John R. Jewitt, only survivor of the crew of the ship Boston, during a captivity of nearly three years among the savages of Nootka Sound: with an account of the manners, mode of living, and religious opinions of the natives. digital copy
 Sapir, Edward (1916) "The Social Organization of the West Coast Tribes."  In: Proceedings and Transactions of the Royal Society of Canada for 1915, third series, vol. 9, no. 2, pp. 355–374.

Coast Salish
 Suttles, Wayne (1960) "Affinal Ties, Subsistence, and Prestige among the Coast Salish."  American Anthropologist, vol. 62, no. 2, pp. 296–305.

Columbia River
 French, Kathrine S. (1955) Culture Segments and Variation in Contemporary Social Ceremonialism on the Warm Springs Reservation, Oregon.  Ph.D. dissertation, Department of Political Science, Columbia University, New York.

Native American culture
First Nations culture
Potlatch